The liturgical reforms of Pope Pius XII took place mostly between 1947 and 1958.

Groundwork

On 20 November 1947, Pius XII issued the encyclical Mediator Dei. It included the statement: "the use of the mother tongue in connection with several of the rites may be of much advantage to the people", while reaffirming the normativity of Latin.

Eucharistic fast
Pius XII changed the requirements for fasting before receiving communion in two stages. In 1953, by the Apostolic constitution Christus Dominus, he continued to require not ingesting from midnight before receiving communion, but ruled that water did not break the fast. He also relaxed the fasting requirement for the sick and travelers, those engaged in exhausting physical labor, and for priests who celebrate several Masses on the same day. In 1957, with Sacram Communionem, he replaced the fast from midnight with a three-hour fast from solid food and alcohol and a one-hour fast from other liquids. Ordinary communicants would calculate the time until the moment they took communion; priests fasted based on the time they began saying Mass. The new fasting rules opened the way to scheduling evening Masses, which the fast from midnight regime made all but impossible for those desiring to receive communion.

Use of the vernacular 
Permission for the use of the vernacular for parts of the Mass had been granted on occasion long before the papacy of Pius XII; including in 1906 by Pius X (parts of Yugoslavia), Benedict XV in 1920 (Croatian, Slovenian, and Czech), Pius XI in 1929 (Bavaria). 

Under Pius XII, the Sacred Congregation of Rites granted permission for the use of local languages in countries with expanding Catholic mission activities, including in Indonesia and Japan in 1941–2. In 1949 permission was granted for using Mandarin Chinese in Mass except for the Canon, and for the use of Hindi in India in 1950. Permission was also granted to use a French (1948) and German (1951) translation for rituals other than Mass.

As a means of increasing the participation of the congregation in the celebration of Mass, recognizing that joining in chant is not possible at a Mass that is "read" rather than sung, in 1958 Pius approved the use of hymns in the vernacular at appropriate points in the service. As a means to closer awareness by the congregation he also allowed the epistle and gospel to be read aloud by a layman while the celebrant read them quietly in Latin.

Though insisting on the primacy of Latin in the liturgy of the Western Church (cf. Mediator Dei, par. 60), Pius XII approves the use of the vernacular in the Ritual for sacraments and other rites outside the Mass. All such permissions, however, were to be granted by the Holy See, and Pius XII strongly condemned the efforts of individual priests and communities to introduce the vernacular on their own authority. He allowed the use of the vernacular in other rites and sacraments outside the Mass, in the service for Baptism and Extreme Unction.

Liturgical propers and other directives 
Following in the footsteps of his predecessors, Pius XII instituted a number of new feasts and approved new propers. After defining the Dogma of the Assumption in 1950, a new mass formula (the mass Signum magnum) was introduced for the feast,  which falls on August 15. Pius XII also instituted the feast of the Immaculate Heart of Mary, which he established as a double of the second class and fixed to August 22, the octave day of the Assumption. Other new feasts included the feast of the Queenship of Mary (May 31) and the feast of Saint Joseph the Worker (to coincide with the socialist holiday of May 1), which thus replaced the Feast of Saint Joseph Patron of the Universal Church, observed until then (from 1870) as a movable feast on the third Wednesday after Easter.

The Sacred Congregation of Rites had jurisdiction over the Rites  and ceremonies of the Latin Church  such as Holy Mass,  sacred functions and divine worship. It issued the location of the blessed sacrament within the Church, to be always at the main altar in the centre of the Church. The Church should display religious objects, but not be overloaded with secondary items or even Kitsch. Modern sacred art should be reverential and still reflect the spirit of our time. Since 1942, priests are permitted to officiate marriages without Holy Mass. They may also officiate confirmations in certain instances.

Easter Vigil 
In 1951 on an experimental basis, and then permanently in 1956, Pope Pius XII introduced the Easter Vigil, a celebration of Easter night based on restoration of ancient forms. He shifted the hour of the celebration to after sunset and restructured the service. The Paschal candle is the center of the service of new fire, rather than a three-branched candle of medieval origin that had existed only for use in this service; the congregation lights its own candles as well, a participatory innovation. The water is blessed in front of the congregation, not at the baptismal font. Among many detailed changes, only four of the traditional Old Testament readings were kept. Then followed only the first part of the Litany of the Saints and possible baptisms. A major innovation occurred with the incorporation of renewal of baptismal promises by the entire congregation, "a milestone" that introduced modern languages into the general Roman liturgy for the first time.

His re-introduction of the Easter Vigil was generally popular, although it faced a cool reception from some prelates. Cardinal Spellman of New York considered asking for a dispensation from performing the new Easter Vigil rite, but relented. Another assessment saw initial enthusiasm that lasted only a few years and concluded that only novelty had attracted attention in the first years. Other Christian denominations adopted the popular Roman Catholic  Easter ceremonies in later years, an ecumenical influence of Pius XII.

Holy Week rites
In 1955, Pius XII promulgated new liturgies for Holy Week in the decree Maxima Redemptionis (November 19, 1955). In addition to the new Easter Vigil, modified on an experimental basis in 1951 and now made permanent, he promulgated the rites for Palm Sunday, Holy Thursday and Good Friday, the most important ceremonies in the Roman liturgy. The Holy Thursday Mass of the Lord's Supper was moved from morning to evening to replicate more closely the experience of the historical Last Supper and the Good Friday liturgy similarly moved to the afternoon.

The new Good Friday liturgy modified the Good Friday prayer for the Jews in two ways. Pius had already, in 1949, made a public declaration that the Latin word "perfidus", which is applied to the Jewish people in this prayer, means "unbelieving", not "perfidious" or "treacherous". The 1955 liturgy rendered the text in English as "the faithless Jews". It also called for the congregation to kneel for a moment of silent prayer during this petition just as the congregation did during the other nine petitions in this liturgy.

Other

As the Liturgical Movement had long been exploring the history and form of concelebrating Mass, in 1956, Pius specified that all celebrants say the words of consecration aloud if they mean to participate fully, not just externally.

See also 

 General Roman Calendar of Pope Pius XII
 Eastern canonical reforms of Pius XII
 Latin Psalters#Versio Piana
 Reform of the Roman Breviary by Pope Pius X
 Liturgical reforms of Pope Paul VI

References

Sources 
  Acta Apostolicae Sedis, (AAS) Roma, Vaticano 1939-1959
 Mediator Dei, Acta Apostolicae Sedis, (AAS) Roma, Vaticano 1947, 521 ff
 Gabriel Bertoniere,  The Historical Development of the Easter Vigils in the Greek Church and Related Services, Rome, 1972
 Paul Bradshaw, The New Westminster Dictionary of Liturgy and Worship, 2005
 Cyril Korolevsky, Living Languages in Catholic Worship: An Historical Inquiry, 1957

Catholic liturgy
Theology of Pope Pius XII